Bryan Gary Habana OIS (born 12 June 1983) is a South African former professional rugby union player who initially played as an outside centre but later shifted to the wing. He most recently played for Toulon in the French Top 14 competition, and for the South Africa national team (the Springboks).

Habana was part of the South Africa team that won the 2007 Rugby World Cup and was one of the stars of the tournament, his eight tries equalling the single-tournament record set by Jonah Lomu in 1999. He was subsequently named the 2007 IRB Player of the Year. During the 2015 Rugby World Cup Habana equalled Lomu's career record of 15 tries in World Cups. He is in second place among all time test try scorers, with a total of 67 tries.

Career

Early career 
Habana was born in Johannesburg and named Bryan Gary Habana, after former Manchester United footballers Bryan Robson and Gary Bailey. Habana was educated at King Edward VII School and Rand Afrikaans University (now known as the University of Johannesburg).

He played outside centre and scrumhalf in provincial and age group rugby, but once he was moved to the wing a vast improvement was seen. He was a member of the South African Sevens side in the 2003–2004 World Sevens Series. He made his Currie Cup debut for the Golden Lions in 2004, doing well enough to be voted the country's most promising player that year. That November, he made his Test debut against England at Twickenham aged 21. Though the game was lost 32–16, Habana came on as a reserve to score a try with his first touch of the ball against the then World Cup holders. The following week Habana was moved into the starting line-up, where he contributed two tries to the 45–10 win over Scotland at Murrayfield. The next week, he was selected in the same position, on the left wing, in that year's final match against Argentina in Buenos Aires.

2005–2007 

In 2005, he moved to the Blue Bulls. Following the 2005 Super 12 season, Habana was, as expected, included in the 2005 Springboks squad. He played on the left wing in South Africa's opening match of 2005 against Uruguay, whom the Springboks defeated 134–3, with Habana scoring two tries. South Africa then hosted France for a two test series; drawing the first 30-all, and winning the second 27–13, with Habana scoring two tries in both games. In the lead-up to the 2005 Tri Nations, Habana played in two tests against Australia, the first, a loss at Telstra Stadium, and then a 33–20 win at home at Ellis Park, with Habana scoring in the second Test.

Habana made his Tri Nations debut on 30 July against the Wallabies at the Bulls' home of Loftus Versfeld in Pretoria. South Africa won the match 22–16. The subsequent match against the All Blacks at Newlands was also a win for South Africa. In the second match against Australia in Perth, Habana scored two tries in the 22–19 win. The All Blacks won the last match of the series, a thrilling 31–27 win for the New Zealanders at Carisbrook. Although South Africa did not win the series, Habana had established himself on the international stage, finishing as the tournament's joint highest try-scorer with New Zealands' Doug Howlett and Joe Rokocoko. In the Currie Cup, the Blue Bulls made it to the final, which was played at home at Loftus Versfeld, against the Free State Cheetahs. The Cheetahs, somewhat underdogs, won the final. In November of that year, Habana earned caps for South Africa against Argentina, Wales and France, scoring two tries in the Welsh match. Habana was named to the five-man shortlist for 2005 IRB World Player of the Year, and was also selected by SA Rugby as 2005 South Africa Player of the Year in 2005.

The Springboks endured a poor year in 2006 as they lost four of their six tri nations matches. They also lost to France in the midyear test and lost to Ireland 32–15 – a game in which Habana was averted to centre for the first time in a Springbok shirt. He scored a try. They then lost to England in the first test but gained revenge in the second test.

In April 2007 Habana competed against a cheetah in a 100-meter race to help raise awareness of the imminent danger of the cheetah being classified as an endangered species, according to De Wildt officials. He lost, because cheetahs can run 70 mph, instead of 22 mph.

2007 Super 14 
Habana's most dramatic act of the 2007 Super 14 season was his last minute try in the final, enabling flyhalf Derick Hougaard to make an easy conversion and giving the Bulls a dramatic 20–19 victory over the Sharks. The try was especially hard to take for Sharks fans as it was debated if Habana should have even been on the field after dangerously tackling fullback Percy Montgomery in the air, in the opening minutes of the game. Habana later admitted in an interview that, despite not intending to cause Montgomery harm, he should have been sent off for the challenge.

2007 World Cup 
Habana was selected on the wing for the Springboks first game of the 2007 Rugby World Cup, where he scored four tries in the 59–7 win over Samoa in Paris. In South Africa's final group game, he scored two tries against the US in Montpellier. He also scored two tries against Argentina in the semifinal, equalling Jonah Lomu's record of 8 tries in one World Cup. To score the first try, he chipped the defensive line, outran the cover defence, regathered the ball and scored near the corner flag. To score the second, he intercepted the ball after Argentina had gone blindside off a scrum, running nearly the length of the field to dot the ball down under the posts. He was a part of the world cup winning side contributing to the defeat of England in the 2007 final. Habana was awarded the IRB Player of the Year Award at the 2007 IRB Awards, held in Paris on 21 October.

2008 season 

The 2008 season wasn't Habana's greatest. Although he kept his spot in the Springboks side, he failed to make an impact like he did in the previous year. He only scored two tries in the whole year, one against the All Blacks in their 19–8 loss and one against England in the 42–6 win. The team struggled to adapt to new coach Peter de Villiers incoherent model for an expansive game, and thus the Springbok backline failed to find attacking impetus throughout that season. The Springboks had a poor year, only winning two of their six games in the 2008 Tri Nations but came back at the end of the year to win all of their Tour Matches against Wales, Scotland and England.

2009 Super 14 
Habana had a mixed super 14 season. He was quiet on attack, but was a rock on defence, later he found his attacking form and finished the season second top try scorer, with 8 tries. This led to the Blue Bulls regaining their title as Champions of the Southern Hemisphere.

2009 British & Irish Lions tour of South Africa 
Habana had targeted the Lions tour as one of the biggest moments of his career, possibly bigger than the World Cup. In a close first test the South Africans defeated the Lions 26–21, but Habana failed to show the form he had displayed in the Super 14. In the second test, the Lions were more fired up and led 19–8 with 20 minutes to go before Habana burst through their defence and scored one of his most memorable tries. Habana was rested for the final test, a game which South Africa would rather forget as they lost 28–9 but with their series win they gained revenge after losing the 1997 tour.

2009 Tri Nations 
After the Lions series came the Tri-Nations. New Zealand beat Australia in the opening game 22–16, so the pressure was on South Africa to claim a victory over the All Blacks in their opener at Bloemfontein. They did this with a 28–19 win. They played the All Blacks at Durban the following week. This was Habana's 50th test and South Africa won 31–19 with Morné Steyn scoring all 31 points. This was the first time they'd beaten the All Blacks in successive games at home in 33 years (South Africa won 3 out of 4 home tests against New Zealand in 1976). The next week they took on Australia in Cape Town. South Africa once again came home with a 29–17 win. This meant they'd won all of their home games in the tournament for the first time since 2005 putting them on course for their first championship win since 2004. If South Africa take the 2009 Tri-Nations title it would be Habana's first tournament win meaning he would have won every tournament in professional southern hemisphere rugby. South Africa then won their first away-game and their 4th match out of 4 in the Tri Nations with a 32–25 victory over the Wallabies at Subiaco Oval in Perth. Habana scored 2 of the 4 tries. The Springboks would take on the Wallabies in Brisbane a week later, but this time they were outmuscled 21–6. This kept New Zealand in with a chance of claiming the tournament. Habana played well, making a try-saving tackle on Lachie Turner, but came off at halftime with an injury. He was however declared fit for the visit to New Zealand as the Springboks claimed victory by 32–29, to win their first Tri Nations title since 2004. It was also Habana's first success in that tournament. Habana still had the all-time try-scoring record to beat, as he was five tries away from taking it at the end of the 2009 season.

Barbarians 2009
On 5 December, Habana played on the left wing for the Barbarians for their 'Final Challenge' against New Zealand. He scored 3 tries as the Barbarians defeated the All Blacks, who had not lost a match in the Northern hemisphere in 2 years.

Provincial Move 
In 2009 Habana moved to Cape Town, to play for Western Province and the Stormers starting in 2010. Habana played for the Stormers in a losing Super Rugby final in 2010, a losing Currie Cup final for Western Province in 2010 and a winning Currie Cup final in 2012.

2011 Rugby World Cup
Habana was selected for the 2011 Rugby World Cup and played the first game which South Africa won against Wales 17-16 thanks to tries from François Steyn and Hougaard. They were then victorious against Fiji and Namibia before beating Samoa just 13–5 in which Habana scored a ninth minute try. South Africa however were then knocked out of the tournament by Australia in the quarter-finals by 11–9.

2012
Habana played two tests against England in the June internationals and 5 tests in The Rugby Championship against Argentina, Australia and New Zealand. He scored a hat trick of tries against Australia as well as tries, home and away, against the All Blacks

Toulon 

On 11 January 2013, Habana confirmed he would move to French club Toulon at the end of the 2013 Super Rugby season, on a three-year contract. Toulon won the Heineken Cup and Top 14 in 2014 and the European Champions Cup in 2015.

2015 Rugby World Cup
Habana was selected for the 2015 Rugby World Cup, where he equalled Jonah Lomu's record of 15 World Cup tries with a hat-trick against the USA. South Africa lost 20–18 in the semi-finals to eventual champions New Zealand and subsequently finished third.

Habana was made vice-captain of South Africa in 2016, and brought his career try tally to 67.

Retirement
On 24 April 2018, Habana announced his retirement from all rugby at the end of his French Top 14 club Toulon's season.

International tries

Honours 
Blue Bulls
 Currie Cup: 2009

Bulls
 Super Rugby: 2007, 2009

Western Province
 Currie Cup: 2012

Toulon
 Heineken Cup European Champions/European Rugby Champions Cup: 2014, 2015
 Top 14 French League: 2014

South Africa
 Rugby World Cup: 2007
 Tri-Nations: 2009
 Lions series winner: 2009

South Africa Rugby Union Awards
 SARU Player of the Year: 2005, 2007 and 2012
 SuperSport Try of the year: 2007, 2012

International Rugby Board awards
 International Rugby Board Player of the Year: 2007
 International Rugby Players' Association Try of the Year: 2012

Personal life 
On 20 September 2009, Habana married his longtime girlfriend, Janine Viljoen, at Sorex Estate's chapel in Centurion.

See also
 List of international rugby union tries by Bryan Habana

References

External links 
 Stormers profile
 
 statistics on itsrugby.co.uk
 Springbok Hall of Fame
 

1983 births
Living people
People from Benoni
Cape Coloureds
Rugby union wings
South African rugby union players
South Africa international rugby union players
Bulls (rugby union) players
Stormers players
Western Province (rugby union) players
Golden Lions players
Blue Bulls players
Barbarian F.C. players
RC Toulonnais players
Alumni of King Edward VII School (Johannesburg)
World Rugby Awards winners
World Rugby Players of the Year
South African expatriate rugby union players
South African expatriate sportspeople in France
Expatriate rugby union players in France
South Africa international rugby sevens players
Male rugby sevens players
Recipients of the Order of Ikhamanga
Rugby union players from Johannesburg